Inamullah Khan Niazi is a Pakistani politician who had been a Member of the Provincial Assembly of the Punjab, from 1993 to 1996 and again from November 2014 to May 2018. He had been a member of the National Assembly of Pakistan from 1997 to 1999.

Early life and education
He was born on 9 October 1955 in Mianwali.

He has a degree of the Bachelor of Architect which he obtained from National College of Arts in 1984.

Political career
He was elected to the Provincial Assembly of the Punjab as a candidate of Pakistan Muslim League (N) (PML-N) from Constituency PP-38 (Mianwali) in 1993 Pakistani general election. He received 14,793 votes and defeated an independent candidate.

He was elected to the National Assembly of Pakistan as a candidate of PML-N from Constituency NA-54 (Mianwali-II) in 1997 Pakistani general election. He received 53,861 votes and defeated Humair Hayat Khan Rokhri.

He ran for the seat of the Provincial Assembly of the Punjab as a candidate of PML-N from Constituency PP-44 (Mianwali-II) in 2002 Pakistani general election, but was unsuccessful. He received 152 votes and lost the seat to Gul Hameed Khan Rokhri. In the same election, he ran for the seat of the National Assembly from Constituency NA-72 (Mianwali-II) as a candidate of PML-N but was unsuccessful. He received 30,018 votes and lost the seat to a candidate of Pakistan Peoples Party.

He ran for the seat of the National Assembly from Constituency NA-71 (Mianwali-I) and Constituency NA-72 (Mianwali-II) as a candidate of PML-N in 2008 Pakistani general election,  but was unsuccessful. He received 2,087 votes in Constituency NA-71 and  44,868 votes in Constituency NA-72 and lost the seat to Nawabzada Malik Amad Khan and Humair Hayat Khan Rokhri, respectively.

He quit PML-N in 2012 and joined Pakistan Tehreek-e-Insaf (PTI).

He was re-elected to the Provincial Assembly of the Punjab as an independent candidate from Constituency PP-48 (Bhakkar-II) in by-polls held in November 2014. In February 2015, he re-joined PML-N.

Family
He is the cousin of former Pakistani Prime Minister Imran Khan and brother of Hafeez Ullah Niazi and Najeebullah Khan Niazi.

References

1955 births
Living people
Punjab MPAs 1993–1996
Pakistani MNAs 1997–1999
Punjab MPAs 2013–2018
Pakistan Muslim League (N) MNAs
People from Mianwali District
Inamullah